Etymon is a song written by Bobby Ljunggren, Ingela Forsman and Henrik Wikström, and performed by Sonja Aldén, using the stage name "Sonya", during the Swedish Melodifestivalen 2006. The song ended up 5th during the competition in Karlstad on 25 February 2006, and was also released as a single the same year. However, the song failed to enter Svensktoppen. At the Swedish singles chart, the song peaked at 35:e position . Spanish artist Rosa recorded the song with lyrics in Spanish, and released it in Spain.

Charts

References

2006 songs
2006 singles
English-language Swedish songs
Melodifestivalen songs of 2006
Sonja Aldén songs
Songs written by Bobby Ljunggren
Songs written by Henrik Wikström
Songs with lyrics by Ingela Forsman
Swedish pop songs